Khaled Serwash (Arabic:خالد سرواش) (born 21 May 1991) is an Emirati footballer who plays as a defender .

External links

References

Emirati footballers
1991 births
Living people
Al-Nasr SC (Dubai) players
Emirates Club players
Ras Al Khaimah Club players
Khor Fakkan Sports Club players
UAE First Division League players
UAE Pro League players
Association football defenders